Determination is a 1922 American silent drama film directed by Joseph Levering and starring Maurice Costello.

Cast
 Alpheus Lincoln as John Morton Jr. / James Melvale
 Corene Uzzell as Madge Daley
 Irene Tams as Lucky
 Maurice Costello as Putnam
 Walter Ringham as Lord Warburton
 Gene Burnell as Frances Lloyd
 Mabel Allen as Lady Dalton
 Byron Russell as Lord Dalton
 Nina Herbert as Whitechapel Mary
 Charles Ascot as Dopefiend 
 Hayden Stevenson as Sport Smiler
 Bernard Randall	
 Louis Wolheim

References

Bibliography
 Langman, Larry. American Film Cycles: The Silent Era. Greenwood Publishing, 1998.

External links
 

1922 films
1922 drama films
1920s English-language films
American silent feature films
Silent American drama films
American black-and-white films
Films directed by Joseph Levering
Films set in London
1920s American films